

See also
 

Somali
Writers